Dunn may refer to:

Places in the United States
 Dunn, Indiana, a ghost town
 Dunn, Missouri, an unincorporated community
 Dunn, North Carolina, a city
 Dunn County, North Dakota, county
 Dunn, Texas, an unincorporated community
 Dunn County, Wisconsin, county
 Dunn, Dane County, Wisconsin, town
 Dunn, Dunn County, Wisconsin, town

People
Dunn baronets, three baronetcies in the Baronetage of the United Kingdom
Dunn (bishop), an 8th-century English bishop
Dunn (surname), a surname

Taxonomy
There are 2 different instances where the last name Dunn is used to give the authority behind names of species:
Emmett Reid Dunn (1894–1956), U. S. zoologist, mostly in the names of snakes, frogs etc. in the Americas
Stephen Troyte Dunn (1868–1938), British botanist, mostly in the names of plants in China

Other
Dunn Engineering, racecar makers
J. E. Dunn Construction Group, a construction company
Dunn Memorial Bridge in Albany, New York
Dunn's, a Canadian restaurant chain
Dunns, a clothing retailer, subsidiary of Pepkor

See also
 Dun (disambiguation)
 Dunn Brothers (disambiguation)
 Dunne, Irish surname 
 Dunnes, Irish retail chain 
 Justice Dunn (disambiguation)